Karaulnoye is a rural locality (a selo) and the administrative center of Karaulinsky Selsoviet, Kamyzyaksky District, Astrakhan Oblast, Russia. The population was 810 as of 2010. There are 8 streets.

Geography 
Karaulnoye is located 32 km south of Kamyzyak (the district's administrative centre) by road. Kirovsky is the nearest rural locality.

References 

Rural localities in Kamyzyaksky District